Mons Joseph (born 30 May 1964) is an Indian politician and lawyer. He belongs to Kerala Congress led by P. J. Joseph. He had been the Minister for Public Works from 18 October 2007 till his resignation for his party chairman P. J. Joseph to become the minister. Elected from Kaduthuruthy constituency in 2006, 2011, 2016 and 2021.

On 19 March 2021, he and his colleague P. J. Joseph resigned from their respective MLA positions fearing disqualification due to issues relating to their newly formed party's symbol allocation. He had won the 2021 Kerala Legislative Assembly election from Kaduthuruthy by 4000 votes.

Early life 
He was born at Kaduthuruthy on 30 May 1964. His parents are O. Joseph and Mariamma Joseph. Mons graduated to M.A., LL.B., Advocate and served as Social and Political Worker. He entered politics through K.S.C. while a student. He served as Chairman and General Secretary of K.S.C., Baselius College, Kottayam, President and General Secretary of Students Congress, President, Youth Front (J) State Committee and Kerala Congress Kottayam District Committee. He held position of President of the Post Graduate students' association and office bearer of various trade unions and served as member of the Kerala youth welfare committee, consumer protection committee, and Mahatma Gandhi University senate. He also held many students agitations.

Personal life
Mons is married to Sonia, who works as a high school teacher. The couple have a son and a daughter; his son died in an accident in 2013.

References

 Official website of Government of Kerala, Mons Joseph
 Official Government of Kerala website, key contacts
 Shri Mons Joseph sworn in as Minister for Works 
 Mons Joseph to be sworn in on 18 October

 God's own country gets minister by lottery

Malayali politicians
Living people
1964 births
People from Kottayam district
Kerala Congress (M) politicians
Kerala MLAs 1996–2001
Kerala MLAs 2011–2016
Kerala MLAs 2016–2021